La Musica may refer to:

 La Musica (music festival), a chamber music festival in Sarasota, Florida
 La Musica (film), a 1967 French drama film